Oxymorrons are an American alternative hip hop rock band from Queens, NY, consisting of vocalist Demi "Deee"  and brother Kami “KI” drummer Matty Mayz and vocalist/guitarist/bassist Jafe Paulino

Career
Oxymorrons began as a collaboration between Queens-bred brothers, Kami (K.I.) and Demi (Deee), who joined forces to create a hip hop and rock fusion act. After years spent playing and touring with other groups, the brothers decided it was time to set the New York scene ablaze with their sonic creations. The lineup expanded with the addition of staple drummer Matty Mayz, whose blistering talent alongside Vocalist/bassist/guitarist Jafe Paulino has become an intricate part of the bands live show. The genre-blending masterminds use their musical platform to speak for, and to, the rejected. Their message of embracing ones individuality resonates with their fellow underdogs.

The potent mixture of the band's sharp-witted lyrics and mesmerizing music has earned them a legion of loyal fans and inspired collaborations with Travie McCoy, Saba, Sam Gongol of Marian Hill, Maxine Ashley (Pharrell/I am OTHER) and Wynter Gordon. Oxymorrons caught attention with their undeniable artistry and found synergy in brand partnerships with RedBull, Converse, Rocawear, DeadBolt, Karmaloop, and Modify Watches. It's their captivating live show full of non-stop energy that has music lovers entranced. The band has played many notable festivals including SXSW, Firefly, AfroPunk, Funk Fest, CMJ on top of sharing the stage with dynamic acts like Lupe Fiasco, Common, Ludacris, Juicy J, Gym Class Heroes, Bruno Mars, Bad Rabbits, Rihanna, Salt N Pepa, Danny Brown, Waka Flocka and more.

They have received support from various alternative and hip hop media outlets, including Uproxx, Paste Music and Consequence Of Sound and have had their music featured in ads for ABC's 'The Mayor' and Converse.

The band released "Brunch" as the first single from their next project on February 2, 2018. VIBE dubbed them "The Mash Out Posse" for their clash of hip-hop, rock, funk and alternative sounds.

Band members
 Dave "D" Bellevue - Vocals
 Ashmy "KI" Bellevue - Vocals
 Matty Mayz - Drums
 Jafe Paulino - Vocals/Bass/Guitar

Discography

 Mohawks and Durags (June 2021)
Green Vision
See Stars
Justice
Complex But Basic (October 2016)

References 

Afro Punk, "PUNKS GOTTA EAT: If Bands Were Food, What Food Would They Be"
Stuff Fly People Like, "New Video: Wynter Gordon 'TKO' feat Oxymorrons"
Arjanwrites.com, "FRESH NEW TRACKS: Oxymorrons 'Padded Sky'"
Taco Bell, "Feed The Beat: Featured Artists"
 The Fader, "Oxymorrons Find The Positives In Pain And Loss In “Hello Me” Video" (03/03/16)
 Noisey, "WE SAW THIS: DANNY BROWN, LE1F, THE SKINS, AND OXYMORRONS AT THE KNITTING FACTORY" (03/22/13)
 The Source, "SALT-N-PEPA AND OPENER OXYMORRONS ROCK HIGHLINE BALLROOM" (06/08/14)
 Modern Drummer, "Drummer Blog: Oxymorrons’ Matty Mayz on Hip-Hop and Keeping Things Groovy" (12/01/14)
 Performer Magazine, "Oxymorrons: June 2013 Cover Story" (06/25/13)
 Consequence of Sound, :https://consequence.net/2016/02/queens-hip-hop-group-oxymorrons-share-new-single-hello-me-listen/
 HipHopDX, http://hiphopdx.com/videos/id.18044/title.oxymorrons-808-clap
 OkayPlayer, http://www.okayplayer.com/news/oxymorrons-hello-me-colino-fresh-remix-mp3.html
 MTV, http://www.mtv.com/news/2303825/oxymorrons-alone-video/
 DJ Booth, http://djbooth.net/tracks/review/2015-03-10-oxymorrons-808clap-remix-travie-mccoy-saba-khary-durgans-tybuddh

External links
 Official website

American musical duos
American hip hop groups
Alternative hip hop groups
Rap rock groups
Hip hop groups from New York City
Musical groups established in 2009
Musical groups from Queens, New York